Dyckia frigida is a plant species in the genus Dyckia. This species is native to Brazil.

References

frigida
Flora of Brazil
Taxa named by Joseph Dalton Hooker